Charles Murray (born August 18, 1968 in Rochester, New York, United States) is a retired American boxer who boxed at light welterweight.

Career 
Murray was the 1987 United States Amateur Lightweight champion. Known as "The Natural", Murray turned pro in 1989 and won the vacant IBF light welterweight title with a decision win over Rodney Moore in 1993. He defended the title twice before losing it in 1994 to Jake Rodriguez via a majority decision. After the loss to Rodriguez, Murray quickly drifted from championship status to journeyman. He never challenged for a major title again and hasn't fought since 2004.

In Murray's career he had 44 wins (26 by KO), 9 losses (2 by KO) and 0 draws.

Personal life 
Murray has six children, Marquis Rashaad, Kennedy B.,Tehilyah Lyric, Chase “Prince”, Kendrick, and Ava. Murray was married on August 16, 2008, in addition a step-son Nyles Goodwin.

Boxing trainer 
Murray now trains boxers, and has trained Jerson Ravelo amongst other professional fighters.

References 
 

1968 births
Living people
Sportspeople from Rochester, New York
World boxing champions
Winners of the United States Championship for amateur boxers
American male boxers
Light-welterweight boxers